The Trinidad and Tobago National Beach Soccer Team represents Trinidad and Tobago in International Beach Soccer Competitions and is controlled by the Trinidad and Tobago Football Association, the governing body for football in Trinidad and Tobago. The team has competed in two CONCACAF Beach Soccer Championships. Finishing 7th in Nassau, Bahamas 2013 and 5th in Costa del Sol, El Salvador 2015. They won the Lucayan Cup in October 2015 defeating hosts Bahamas 5-3 and Mexico 5-4. They are currently ranked 50th in the world (7th in CONCACAF) according to Beach Soccer Worldwide.

Current squad

Achievements

CONCACAF Beach Soccer Championship

References

http://www.concacaf.com/category/beach-soccer/game-detail/224641 Retrieved 2015-04-19.

External links
https://web.archive.org/web/20141118223927/http://www.concacaf.com/team/belize
https://web.archive.org/web/20140626142413/http://www.concacaf.com/category/beach-soccer
http://www.cfufootball.org/index.php/member-associations/9209-Trinidadandtobago

North American national beach soccer teams
B